"One in a Million" is a song written by Chick Rains, and recorded by American country music artist Johnny Lee. It was released in October 1980 as the second single from the album Lookin' for Love.  The song was Lee's second number one on the country chart.  The single stayed at number one for two weeks, and also spent a total of thirteen weeks on the country chart.

Chart performance

References
 

1980 singles
Johnny Lee (singer) songs
Song recordings produced by Jim Ed Norman
Asylum Records singles
Songs written by Chick Rains
1980 songs